Webb's a.k.a. H. S. Webb, was a department store based in Glendale, California, the first in that city.

Origins
The store was founded by Harry S. Webb (d. 1947) in 1917 in Downtown Glendale in a single room. It had locations in the Glendale Fashion Center and in Redlands, California. 

Ned Blanc purchased the store from Webb in 1949 but kept the name. 

In 1951 Blanc expanded the original store at 139 N. Brand into the adjacent Lawson Building. 

There was a fire at the store in 1977. Webb's moved to a former J. C. Penney store about half the size of Webb's original store, on the southeast corner of Brand Blvd. and California Avenue.

Glendale Fashion Center
Two years later, it moved to the Glendale Fashion Center  in a space vacated by Joseph Magnin when that store moved to the Glendale Galleria. Webb's expanded the space from 30,000 to 67,500 square feet and moved into it on September 27, 1979.

Decline
For half a century, Webb's was the only major department store in Glendale. Competition first came from J. W. Robinson's which opened in the Glendale Fashion Center in 1966, and then from the Glendale Galleria, which opened in 1976 and a second phase in 1982. That mall offered branches of The Broadway, Buffums, J. C. Penney, Mervyn's and Nordstrom.

Sales peaked at $8 million in 1974, but averaged about $5 million per year during its last six years in business. The Glendale store closed in 1985 due to falling sales. It had 30,000 charge account holders at that time.

Redlands store
The Redlands store measured 42,000 square feet and opened on August 30, 1973 in the Citrus Village shopping center, a small center with 16 specialty stores.

References

Defunct department stores based in Greater Los Angeles
Retail companies based in California
Glendale, California
Companies based in Glendale, California